Discography for jazz reedist Ken Vandermark. The year indicates when the album was first released.

Ken Vandermark
 Caffeine (Jim Baker/Steve Hunt/Ken Vandermark):Caffeine (Okka Disk, 1994)
 Standards (Quinnah, 1995)
 Steelwool Trio (Ken Vandermark/Kent Kessler/Curt Newton): International Front (Okka Disk, 1995)
 Barrage Double Trio: Utility Hitter (Quinnah, 1996)
 Cinghiale: Hoofbeats of the Snorting Swine (Eighth Day Music, 1996)
 FJF (Mats Gustafsson/Ken Vandermark/Steve Hunt/Kent Kessler): Blow Horn (Okka Disk, 1997)
 Steam: Real Time (Eighth Day Music, 1997)
 Joe Harriott Project: Straight Lines (Atavistic, 1999)
 Two Days in December (Wobbly Rail, 2002)
 Furniture Music (Okka Disk, 2003)
 Paul Lytton/Ken Vandermark/Philipp Wachsmann: CINC (Okka Disk, 2006)
 Bridge 61: Journal (Atavistic, 2006)
 Ken Vandermark, Kent Kessler, Ingebrigt Håker Flaten & : Collected Fiction (Okka Disk, 2009)
 The Frame Quartet (/Fred Lonberg-Holm/Nate McBride/Ken Vandermark): 35 mm (Okka Disk, 2009)
 iTi (Johannes Bauer/Ken Vandermark/Paal Nilssen-Love/Thomas Lehn): Artifact: Live In St. Johann (Okka Disk, 2010)
 Predella Group: Strade D'Acqua (Multikulti, 2010)
 Mark in the Water (Not Two, 2011)
 Platform 1: Takes Off (Clean Feed, 2012)
 Ken Vandermark's Topology Nonet featuring Joe McPhee: Impressions of Po Music (Okka Disk, 2013)
 Nine Ways to Read a Bridge (Not Two, 2014)
 Site Specific (Audiographic Records, 2015)
 Momentum 1: Stone (Audiographic Records, 2016)
 Escalator (Not Two, 2017)
 Momentum 4: Consequent Duos 2015>2019 (Audiographic Records/Catalytic Sounds, 2019)

The Vandermark Quartet
 Big Head Eddie (Platypus, 1993)
 Solid Action (Platypus, 1994)

The Vandermark 5
 Single Piece Flow (Atavistic, 1997)
 Target or Flag (Atavistic, 1998)
 Simpatico (Atavistic, 1999)
 Burn the Incline (Atavistic, 2000)
 Acoustic Machine (Atavistic, 2001)
 Free Jazz Classics Vol. 1 & 2 (Atavistic, 2002)
 Airports for Light (Atavistic, 2003)
 Elements of Style/Exercises in Surprise (Atavistic, 2004)
 Alchemia (Not Two, 2005)
 The Color of Memory (Atavistic, 2005)
 Free Jazz Classics Vol. 3 & 4 (Atavistic, 2005)
 A Discontinuous Line (Atavistic, 2006)
 Four Sides to the Story (Not Two, 2006)
 Beat Reader (Atavistic, 2008)
 Annular Gift (Not Two, 2009)
 The Horse Jumps and the Ship Is Gone (Not Two, 2010)

The Crown Royals
 All Night Burner (Estrus, 1997)
 Funky-Do! (Estrus, 1999)

DKV Trio
(Hamid Drake/Kent Kessler/Ken Vandermark)
 Fred Anderson / DKV Trio (Okka Disk, 1997)
 Baraka (Okka Disk, 1997)
 DKV Live (limited edition - Okka Disk, 1997)
 Deep Telling (Okka Disk, 1999) - with Joe Morris
 Live in Wels & Chicago, 1998 (Okka Disk, 1999)
 Trigonometry (Okka Disk, 2002)
 AALY Trio/DKV Trio: Double or Nothing (Okka Disk, 2002)
 Past Present (Not Two, 2012)
 Schl8hof (Trost, 2013) - with Mats Gustafsson, Massimo Pupillo, Paal Nilssen-Love
 Sound in Motion in Sound (Not Two, 2014)
 Collider (Not Two, 2016)

AALY Trio + Ken Vandermark
(Mats Gustafsson/Peter Janson/Kjell Nordeson + Ken Vandermark)
 Hidden in the Stomach (Silkheart, 1998)
 Stumble (Wobbly Rail, 1998)
 Live at the Glenn Miller Café (Wobbly Rail, 1999)
 I Wonder If I Was Screaming (Crazy Wisdom, 2000)

Sound in Action Trio
 Design in Time (Delmark, 1999)
 Gate (Atavistic, 2006)

Tripleplay
 Expansion Slang (Boxholder, 2000)
 Gambit (Clean Feed, 2004)

Spaceways Inc.
(Hamid Drake, Ken Vandermark)
 Thirteen Cosmic Standards (Atavistic, 2000)
 Version Soul (Atavistic, 2002)
 Radiale (Atavistic, 2004) - with Zu

School Days
(Vandermark/Bishop/Nordeson/Håker-Flaten/Nilssen-Love)
 Crossing Division (Okka Disk, 2000)
 In Our Times (Okka Disk, 2002)
 Nuclear Assembly Hall (Okka Disk, 2004) - with Atomic
 Distil (Okka Disk, 2008) - with Atomic

Territory Band
 Transatlantic Bridge (Okka Disk, 2001)
 Atlas (Okka Disk, 2002)
 Map Theory (Okka Disk, 2004)
 Company Switch (Okka Disk, 2005)
 A New Horse for the White House (Okka Disk, 2006)
 Collide (Okka Disk, 2007) - with Fred Anderson

FME
(Paal Nilssen-Love//Ken Vandermark)
 Live at the Glenn Miller Cafe (Okka Disk, 2002)
 Underground (Okka Disk, 2004)
 Cuts (Okka Disk, 2005)
 Montage (Okka Disk, 2006)

Paal Nilssen-Love & Ken Vandermark
 Dual Pleasure (Smalltown Supersound, 2002)
 Dual Pleasure 2 (Smalltown Supersound, 2004)
 Seven (Smalltown Supersound, 2006)
 Chicago Volume (Smalltown Supersound, 2010)
 Milwaukee Volume (Smalltown Supersound, 2010)
 Letter to a Stranger (Smalltown Supersound, 2011)
 Lightning Over Water (Laurence Family, 2014)
 Extended Duos (Audiographic/PNL, 2014)

Free Fall
 Furnace (Wobbly Rail, 2003)
 Amsterdam Funk (Smalltown Supersonic, 2005)
 The Point in a Line (Smalltown Supersonic, 2007)
 Gray Scale (Smalltown Supersonic, 2010)

Sonore
(Peter Brötzmann/Mats Gustafsson/Ken Vandermark)
 No One Ever Works Alone (Okka Disk, 2004)
 Only the Devil Has No Dreams (Jazzwerkstatt, 2007)
 Call Before You Dig (Okka Disk, 2009)
 Cafe OTO / London (Trost, 2011)

Powerhouse Sound
 Oslo/Chicago: Breaks (Atavistic, 2007)
 Overlap (Laurence Family, 2010)

Daisy / Vandermark Duo
(/Ken Vandermark)
 August Music (Self-released, 2007)
 Light on the Wall (Laurence Family, 2009)
 The Conversation (Multikulti, 2011)

Fire Room
 Broken Music (Atavistic, 2008)
 Second Breath (Bocian, 2013)

The Resonance Ensemble
 Resonance (Not Two, 2008)
 Resonance (Box set) (Not Two, 2009)
 Kafka in Flight (Not Two, 2011)
 What Country Is This? (Not Two, 2012)
 Head Above Water, Feet Out the Fire (Not Two, 2013)
 Double Arc (Not Two, 2015)

Lean Left
(Paal Nilssen-Love/Terrie Ex/Andy Moor/Ken Vandermark)
 Volume 1 (Smalltown Supersound, 2009/Catalytic Sound, 2010)
 Volume 2 (Smalltown Supersound, 2010)
 Live at Cafe Oto (Unsounds, 2012)
 Live at Cafe Oto Day One with Ab Baars (Catalytic Sound, 2012)
 Live at Area Sismica (Unsounds, 2014)

Side A
 A New Margin (Clean Feed, 2011)
 In the Abstract (Not Two, 2014)

Double Tandem
 Cement (PNL, 2012)
 Ox (dEN, 2012)

Made To Break
 Provoke (Clean Feed, 2013)
 Lacerba (Clean Feed, 2013)
 Cherchez La Femme (Trost, 2014)
 Before the Code (Trost, 2015)
 Before the Code: Live (Audiographic, 2016)
 N N N (Audiographic, 2016)
 Dispatch to the Sea (Audiographic, 2016)
 Trebuchet (Trost, 2017)

The Margots
 Pescado (Okka Disk, 2013)
 Sople (Okka Disk, 2014)

Audio One
(/Josh Berman/Jeb Bishop/////Dave Rempis/Ken Vandermark/Mars Williams)
 An International Report (Audiographic, 2014)
 The Midwest School (Audiographic, 2014)
 What Thomas Bernhard Saw (Audiographic, 2015)

DEK Trio
(//Ken Vandermark)
 Burning Below Zero (Trost Records, 2016)
 Construct 1 - Stone (Audiographic, 2017)
 Construct 2 - Artfacts (Audiographic, 2017)
 Divadlo 29 (Audiographic, 2017)

Marker
(Ken Vandermark/Macie Stewart///)
 Wired for Sound (Audiographic, 2018)
 Roadwork 1 / Roadwork 2 / Homework 1 3-CD set (Audiographic, 2018)

Other collaborations
 Joe McPhee/Ken Vandermark/Kent Kessler: A Meeting in Chicago (Eighth Day Music, 1997; Okka Disk reissue)
 Joe Morris/Ken Vandermark/Hans Poppel: Like Rays  (Knitting Factory, 1998)
 Paul Lytton/Ken Vandermark: English Suites (Wobbly Rail, 2000)
 Pipeline (Corbett vs. Dempsey, 2000, issued 2013)
 Pandelis Karayorgis//Ken Vandermark: No Such Thing (Boxholder, 2001)
 Ken Vandermark & : Duets (Future Reference, 2003)
 Gold Sparkle Trio + Ken Vandermark: Brooklyn Cantos (Squealer, 2004)
 Rutherford/Vandermark/Müller/van der Schyff: Hoxha (Spool, 2005)
 //Ken Vandermark: 'Ideas (Not Two, 2005)
 Morris/Vandermark/Gray: Rebus (Clean Feed, 2007)
 Vandermark/Karayorgis: Foreground Music (Okka Disk, 2007)
 Broo/Lane/Nilssen-Love/Vandermark: 4 Corners (Clean Feed, 2007)
 The Thing + Ken Vandermark: Immediate Sound (Smalltown Supersound, 2007)
 Ab Baars Trio + Ken Vandermark: Goofy June Bug (Wig, 2008)
 C.O.D.E.: Play the Music of Ornette Coleman & Eric Dolphy (Cracked An Egg, 2008)
 Vandermark/Guy/Sanders: Fox Fire (Maya, 2009)
 Reed Trio: Last Train to the First Station (Kilogram, 2011)
 Full Blast and Friends: Sketches and Ballads (Trost, 2011)
 Paul Lytton/ + Ikue Mori/Ken Vandermark: The Nows (Clean Feed, 2012)
 Vandermark/Gustafsson: Verses (Corbett vs. Dempsey, 2013)
 Rara Avis: Mutations / Multicellular Mutations (dEN, 2013)
 Vandermark/Grubbs: Parallax Sounds (Just Temptation, 2014)
 Ken Vandermak & Nate Wooley Duo: East by Northwest (Audiographic/Pleasure of the Text, 2014)
 Ken Vandermak & Nate Wooley Duo: All Directions Home (Audiographic/Pleasure of the Text, 2015)
 Rara Avis: Rara Avis (Not Two, 2015)
 Barry Guy/Ken Vandermark: Occasional Poems (Not Two, 2015)
 Mars Williams/Dave Rempis/Ken Vandermark/[:  Western Automatic (Aerophonic Records, 2015)
 Lasse Marhaug/Ken Vandermark: Close Up (Audiographic Records, 2016)
 Terrie Hessels/Ken Vandermark: Splinters (Audiographic Records, 2016)
 Shelter (//Ken Vandermark/Nate Wooley): Shelter (Audiographic Records, 2017)
 /Michael Thieke/Ken Vandermark: Triptych (Catalytic Sound, 2017)
 Rutherford/Vandermark/Müller/van der Schyff: Are We in Diego? (WhirrbooM!, 2018)
 Ken Vandermark/Michael Snow :Vandermark & Snow: DUOL (Corbett vs. Dempsey, 2019)

As sideman

With Jeb Bishop
 98 Duets (Wobbly Rail, 1998)

With Boxhead Ensemble
 Dutch Harbor – Where the Sea Breaks Its Back (Atavistic, 1997)
 The Last Place to Go (Atavistic, 1998)

With Peter Brötzmann - The Chicago Octet/Tentet/Tentet Plus Two
 The Chicago Octet/Tentet (Okka Disk, 1998)
 Stone/Water (Okka Disk, 2000)
 Two Lightboxes (2000)
 Broken English (Okka Disk, 2002)
 Short Visit to Nowhere (Okka Disk, 2002)
 Images (Okka Disk, 2004)
 Signs (Okka Disk, 2004)
 Be Music, Night (Okka Disk, 2005)
 American Landscapes 1 (Okka Disk, 2007)
 American Landscapes 2 (Okka Disk, 2007)
 At Molde 2007 (Okka Disk, 2008)
 3 Nights in Oslo (Smalltown Supersound, 2010)
 Walk, Love, Sleep (Smalltown Supersound, 2012)

With The Denison/Kimball Trio
Neutrons (Quarterstick, 1997)

With The Flying Luttenbachers
 Constructive Destruction (ugEXPLODE, 1994)
 Destroy All Music (ugEXPLODE, 1994)

With Alan Licht & Loren Mazzacane Connors
 Hoffman Estates (Drag City, 1998)

With Misha Mengelberg
 Two Days in Chicago (hatOLOGY, 1999)

With the NRG Ensemble
 Calling All Mothers (Quinnah, 1994)
 This Is My House (Delmark, 1996)
 Bejazzo Gets a Facelift (Atavistic, 1998)

With Eric Revis
 Parallax (Clean Feed, 2013)

With Luke Stewart Exposure Quintet
 Luke Stewart Exposure Quintet (Astral Spirits, 2020)

With Witches & Devils
 At the Empty Bottle (Knitting Factory, 2000)

Guest appearances
 Syl Johnson: Back in the Game (Delmark, 1994)
 Gastr del Sol: Camoufleur (1998)
 Pinetop Seven: Rigging the Toplights (1998)
 Superchunk: Come Pick Me Up (1999)
 Portastatic feat. Ken Vandermark/: The Perfect Little Door (Merge, 2001)
 Zu: Igneo (2002)

See also
List of experimental big bands

References

External links
Official site
Ken Vandermark Discography (1984-2006)

Discographies of American artists
Jazz discographies